Monnai is a former commune in the Orne department in north-western France. On 1 January 2016, it was merged into the new commune of La Ferté-en-Ouche. It had a population of 222 as of 2004.

History
The village was founded as "Moenai" in 1100. Following the tradition, the chapel Notre-Dame-du-Vallet was built after the discovery of a statue; it was rebuilt in 16th century and again in 1862. The old village of Ternant, mentioned for the first time in 1100, was linked to Monnai.

In 2005, the "Carrefour des Cultures" 5-day international gathering occurred in Monnai.

See also
 Communes of the Orne department

References

External links

 Monnai village website

Former communes of Orne